is a Japanese romantic comedy manga series by Koharu Inoue. It was serialized online via Shogakukan's Sunday Webry website from October 2017 to May 2022, with its chapters collected in sixteen tankōbon volumes. An anime television series adaptation produced by J.C.Staff aired from July to September 2021. A second season is set to premiere in July 2023.

Characters
 / 

A young noble who was bewitched since childhood with a curse that kills anything he touches. Because of it, he is disowned by his mother and sent to live in a separate estate inside a forest with only a butler and his maid Alice.

The duke's childhood friend and personal maid who is infatuated with him. Despite knowing that touching the duke can kill her, Alice likes to flirt with him, usually with comical results.

The duke's old butler and his only servant besides Alice.

The duke's youngest sister, Viola likes older men and has feelings for Rob, usually visiting her brother's house just to see him.

The duke's younger brother who was chosen to replace him as the family's heir. Despite that, Walter always has a feeling of inferiority towards his brother and always attempts to surpass him.

A young witch who befriends the duke and Alice. Cuff is skilled with fire magic and works in a circus with Zain. Cuff views the world with a sense of immaturity, and child-like wonder (as evidenced by her affinity for Santa Claus). It is hinted that she has feelings for Zain. 

A wizard with bird features and a perverted behavior who is Cuff's companion. Zain always attempts to flirt with Cuff, who rejects him at first but eventually warms up to him. Zain is skilled with time magic, a rare and powerful trait that makes him the target of other witches.

The leader of the witches, replacing her older sister Sade. Like Cuff and Zain, Daleth also befriends the duke and Alice, helping them to look for a way to break the duke's curse. In the past, she was disfigured by Sade and since then she disguises her head with magic as a skull in shame, until Walter compliments her true face, which also makes her fall in love with him.

Alice's mother who somehow has a connection with the witches, despite not being one of them. Years ago, she was apparently killed by Sade but revives later in the story, reuniting with her daughter.

The Duke's mother who disowned him after he was cursed. Behind her strict facade, she still cares for her son and wants him to break his curse so that he can return to the family. She is good friends with Sharon.

The main antagonist and former leader of the witches. Sade is responsible for several acts of cruelty such as the duke's curse, Daleth's scar and Sharon's apparent death. It's said that she died many years ago but traces of her magic are usually seen, as a sign that she was not completely destroyed yet.

Media

Manga
Written and illustrated by Koharu Inoue, The Duke of Death and His Maid was serialized on Shogakukan's Sunday Webry website from October 3, 2017, to May 17, 2022. Shogakukan collected its chapters in sixteen tankōbon volumes, released from January 12, 2018, to July 12, 2022.

On July 2, 2021, Seven Seas Entertainment announced they licensed the series for English publication.

Volume list

Anime
An anime television series adaptation by J.C.Staff was announced on February 2, 2021. The CGI-heavy series is directed by Yoshinobu Yamakawa, with Hideki Shirane overseeing the series' scripts, Michiru Kuwabata designing the characters, and Gen Okuda and Takeshi Watanabe composing the series' music. The opening theme song, "Mangetsu to Silhouette no Yoru" (Full Moon and Silhouette's Night), is performed by Natsuki Hanae and Ayumi Mano, while the ending theme song, "Nocturne", is also performed by Mano. It aired from July 4 to September 19, 2021, on Tokyo MX, BS11, and ytv. Funimation licensed the series outside of Asia. Following Sony's acquisition of Crunchyroll, the series was moved to Crunchyroll. Plus Media Network Asia licensed the series in Southeast Asia and will air it on Aniplus Asia. Medialink licensed the series in Hong Kong, Taiwan and Macau and streaming it in their YouTube channel, Ani-One Asia.

At the end of the series' final episode, it was announced that a second season has been green-lit. It is set to premiere in July 2023.

Episode list

See also
Pushing Daisies — A television series with a similar premise.

References

External links
The Duke of Death and His Maid official manga website at Sunday Webry 
 

Anime series based on manga
Crunchyroll anime
Japanese webcomics
J.C.Staff
Medialink
NBCUniversal Entertainment Japan
Romantic comedy anime and manga
Seven Seas Entertainment titles
Shogakukan manga
Shōnen manga
Supernatural anime and manga
Upcoming anime television series
Webcomics in print